Parnaby is a surname. Notable people with the surname include:

Alan Parnaby (1916–1974), English cricketer and British Army officer
Alan Parnaby (actor), British television and film actor
Bert Parnaby (1924–1992), British actor
Kaia Parnaby,  Australian softball player 
Stuart Parnaby (born 1982), English footballer